M. K. Kumaran  (1914–1994) was a writer, journalist and politician  of  Kerala, India. He was twice elected MP for Chirayinkeezhu, first in 1957, and again in 1962.

He was born on May 29, 1914, in Kottarakara, Kerala.  He increasingly became involved in political activities during his student days and began working (as a political activist?) with the State Congress, a political party which was formed in 1938 to demand responsible governance in the princely state of Travancore. He was educated at Maharaja's College of Arts and the Law College, Trivandrum, then worked as a lawyer for a short time before going into journalism.  Later he joined the Communist Party of India. Having involved in trade union activities in the former Travancore area of Kerala State, he stood in the Lok Sabha elections 1957 and won.   He stood again in 1962 and was re-elected. 

He died in 1994.  He had married in 1946 Shrimati C. N. Subhadra. His son M. K. Bhadrakumar, a former diplomat and author, has fulfilled assignments in the Soviet Union, South Korea, Sri Lanka, Germany, Afghanistan, Pakistan, Uzbekistan, Kuwait and Turkey.

Electoral history 
 Member of Parliament, Lok Sabha, Second Lok Sabha (1957—62)
 Member of Parliament, Lok Sabha, Third Lok Sabha (1962—67)

Works

 Rakthasakshi
 Pasternakkum Niroopakanmarum
 Tolstoyiyum Bharyayum
 Yamuna-Yude Theerathu 
 Chirakukal

References

Indian male writers
Indian communists
Indian materialists
Malayali people
People from Kollam district
Writers from Kerala
Malayalam-language writers
20th-century Indian translators
1994 deaths
1914 births
20th-century Indian journalists
Indian newspaper editors
India MPs 1957–1962
India MPs 1962–1967